Aomar is a town and commune in Bouïra Province, Algeria. According to the 2011 census it has a population of 28,540.

References

Communes of Bouïra Province
Bouïra Province